Siddharth Sivakumar is an independent cultural journalist and writer. He is the founding editor and present editor-in-chief of the bilingual online cultural magazine Tinpahar.

Family
Siddharh Sivakumar is the son of art historian R. Siva Kumar and Mini Sivakumar. He hails from a family of filmmakers that include Adoor Gopalakrishnan and Padmarajan.

Career
Siddharth regularly writes for art blogs, art magazines such as Art and Deal, online cultural websites such as YouthKiAwaaz.com and Humanities Underground. His articles on socio-cultural issues have appeared in National dailies including The Hindu Business Line, The Statesman etc.

In 2012, Siddharth founded the cultural website Tinpahar. He believes,"presently the boundaries between academic disciplines are being redrawn. What were earlier discrete disciplines of literature, linguistics, philosophy, sociology, history, anthropology or art history are coming closer." And he claims in an interview, "Tinpahar aspires to fully erase this boundary, and become a ‘free and fertile’ space for constructive discourses on/in humanity.

In his articles he often pledges for a reconciliation between art and society. "Although there are more educated people than ever before, there are not many who visit museums or galleries. There is a disconnect between the common man and art today" he writes in The Hindu Business Line.

In 2013 he initiated Make My Website Initiative to  support enthusiastic groups, who are seriously engaged in the creation or promotion of literature, visual arts or specialised studies to build their own websites for free. Websites of Gopi Shankar Madurai's Srishti Madurai and Humanities Underground are made under this scheme.

Stand against Internal Quota

Following the Visva Bharati administration's decision to abolish the 50 percent Internal quota for Visva Bharati's two school Patha Bhavana and Siksha Satra in undergraduate and postgraduate courses, around 400 students blocked the entry to the central and vice-chancellor’s offices to protest. The protest has resulted in class and annual examination boycotts.

According to Siddharth Sivakumar the need to cling on to the quota arose from the students' fear of competition. While distinguishing the protests of Visva Bharati from Hokkolorob, he emphasised on the betterment of the schools rather than endorsing the demand of retaining the 50% internal quota.

In an article published in YouthKiAwaaz.com, he writes, "Their hopelessness nonetheless seems reasonable to me, being a product of the same system and realising that the students have reason to believe that the administration has let them down. But the onus lies with the university administration as much as it does with the schools themselves." Speaking against the Internal Quota, Amartya Sen had remarked, "If our interest lies not in the greater good of the society, if our only concern is limited to the academic opportunism that would benefit our own children, and to this end we employ Quotas, then it is safe to say that there is a fundamental lack in the thought process".

In the second phase of the protests when classes were forcibly shut down Tinpahar published numerous articles severely criticising, what Arani Chakravarty, a senior teacher of the physics department, called `Goondagiri' at Visva Bharati. According to an article published in The Times of India, Siddharth Sivakumar refutes the very idea that the entire student community was involved in class boycotting: "The large number of students accused of avoiding the protest are actually the silenced majority who oppose the agitation and yet, cannot attend classes fearing the consequences. A 'boycott' has to be a voluntary decision and should not be imposed through fear by bringing in outsiders. While the protesters have the right to express their views, if they are democratic as they claim, they should respect the rights of others to attend classes if they wish to."

See also
 Fahad Shah

References

Journalists from Kerala
Living people
Indian magazine founders
Indian magazine editors
Indian publishers (people)
Indian male journalists
Visva-Bharati University alumni
Year of birth missing (living people)